Anthony Grey, 3rd Baron Lucas, styled Earl of Harold (21 February 1695 – 21 July 1723) was a British peer and courtier.

Grey was the eldest son of Henry Grey, 1st Duke of Kent, and his wife, Jemima Crew.

On 17 February 1718, Anthony married Lady Mary Tufton, a daughter and coheiress of Thomas Tufton, 6th Earl of Thanet, by his wife Lady Catharine Cavendish.

He was called to the House of Lords, by writ of acceleration in his father's barony of Lucas, on 8 November 1718.

Lord Harold was a Lord of the Bedchamber to George, Prince of Wales, later King George II, from 1720 until his death in 1723, aged 28, from choking on an ear of barley, the beard of which stuck in his throat. He had no children, so his title reverted to his father and his wife later married John Leveson-Gower, 1st Earl Gower.

References

Courtesy earls
Heirs apparent who never acceded
1695 births
1723 deaths
Accidental deaths in England
Deaths from choking
Burials at the de Grey Mausoleum (Flitton)
Barons Lucas